Casey is a common variation of the Irish Gaelic Cathasaigh/Cathaiseach, meaning vigilant or watchful. At least six different septs used this name, primarily in the Counties of Cork and Dublin.

People with the surname Casey include:

 Adam Casey (disambiguation)
 Al Casey (disambiguation)
 Albert Vincent Casey (1920–2004), United States Postmaster General
 Ann Casey (born 1938), American professional wrestler
 Anne Casey, New Zealand–trained nurse based in England, developer of Casey's model of nursing
 Bernie Casey (1939–2017), American football player and actor
 Bill Casey (born 1945), Canadian politician
 Bill Casey (Gaelic footballer) (1918–1999), Irish Gaelic footballer
 Bill Casey (Dublin Gaelic footballer) (born 1939), Irish Gaelic footballer
 Bill Casey (Australian footballer) (1872–1915), Australian rules footballer
 Bob Casey (rugby union) (born 1978), Irish rugby union footballer
 Bob Casey Sr. (1932–2000), 42nd Governor of Pennsylvania, 1987–1995
 Bob Casey Jr. (born 1960), his son, US Senator from Pennsylvania, 2007–
 Bob Casey (baseball announcer) (1925–2005), Minnesota Twins baseball announcer
 Bob Casey (third baseman) (1859–1939), Canadian baseball player
 Bob Casey (rugby union) (born 1978), London Irish rugby player
 Bob Casey (musician) (1909–1986), American jazz bassist
 Cathal Casey (born 1967), Irish hurler
 Conor Casey (born 1981), American soccer player
 Cortney Casey (born 5 May 1987), American mixed martial artist
 Dan Casey (baseball) (1862–1943), American baseball player attributed to the poem "Casey at the Bat"
 Daniel Casey (born 1972), English actor
 Daniel Casey (born 1981), screenwriter
 Don Casey, American basketball coach
 Dwane Casey (born 1957), head coach of the NBA's Detroit Pistons 
 Eamonn Casey (1927–2017), Roman Catholic Bishop Emeritus of Galway and Kilmacduagh, Ireland
 Ed Casey (1933–2006), leader of the Australian Labor Party in Queensland
 Eddie Casey (1894–1966),  American football player and coach
 Eduardo Casey (1847–1906), Argentine founder of Venado Tuerto
 Edward Pearce Casey (1864–1940), American architect
 E. Owens Blackburne (1848–1894), pen name of Irish writer and novelist Elizabeth Casey
 Eoghan Casey, digital forensics professional
 Frank Casey (died 1994), Australian president of the Public Transport Users Association
 George Casey (disambiguation)
 George W. Casey Sr. (1922–1970), major general, United States Army
 George W. Casey Jr. (born 1948), four-star general, US Army, his son
 George Elliott Casey (1850–1903), Canadian journalist and politician
 Gerard Casey (disambiguation)
 Gerard Casey (philosopher) (born 1951), Professor Emeritus at University College Dublin
 Gerard Casey (artist), Irish artist
 Gerard Casey (Irish republican) (died 1989), member Provisional Irish Republican Army
 Harry Wayne Casey (born 1951), American musician
 Hugh Casey (disambiguation), multiple people
 Jacqueline Casey (1927–1992) American graphic designer
 James Casey (disambiguation)
 James Casey (American football) (born 1984), American football player
 James E. Casey (1888–1983), American businessman
 Jim Casey (footballer) (born 1957), Scottish (soccer) football player
 Joe Casey, American comic book writer
 John Casey (disambiguation)
 John Casey (academic), British academic
 John Casey (mathematician) (1820–1891), Irish geometer
 John Casey (novelist) (born 1939), American novelist
 John Keegan Casey (1846–1870), Irish poet
 Joseph E. Casey (1898–1980), United States Representative from Massachusetts
 Karan Casey (born 1969), Irish folk singer
 Karen Casey (born 1947), Canadian politician
 Kathleen L. Casey (born 1966), commissioner of the U.S. Securities and Exchange Commission
 Ken Casey (born 1969), bass guitarist and frontman of Dropkick Murphys
 Ken Casey, bass guitarist and vocalist of the Boston punk rock group Dropkick Murphys
 Kenneth Casey (disambiguation), several people, including
 Kenneth Casey (1899–1965), American composer and child actor
 Kenneth J. Casey (died 2020), California real estate investor
 Kenneth L. Casey (born 1935), neurologist
 Kevin Casey (disambiguation), multiple people
 Kevin A. Casey (born 1955), American author, musician and humorist
 Kevin Casey (fighter) (born 1981), American mixed martial artist
 Kevin Casey (broadcaster) (1976–2017), Irish radio presenter
 Len Casey (born 1953), English rugby league footballer
 Luis Morgan Casey, American/Bolivian Roman Catholic bishop
 Lyman R. Casey (1837–1914), United States Senator from North Dakota
 Marty Casey (born 1973), American rock musician
 Martyn P. Casey (born 1960), Australian rock bass guitarist
 Maurice Casey (1942-2014) British scholar of the New Testament and early Christianity
 Michael Casey (disambiguation)
 Michael Casey (poet) (born 1947), American poet
 Michael Casey (academic), professor of music at Dartmouth College
 Michael E. Casey (1870–1949), American politician and lawyer in Missouri
 Michael James Casey (1918–1944), British bomber pilot
 Michael T. Casey (1902–1997), Irish Dominican priest and chemist
 Mike Casey (labor leader) (born 1958)
 Natalie Casey, English actress
 Oliver Casey (born 2000), English footballer
 Owen Casey (born 1969), Irish tennis player
 Paddy Casey, Irish singer-songwriter
 Pat Casey (baseball) (born 1959), American baseball coach
 Pat Casey (politician) (born 1961/2), Irish politician
 Patricia Casey, Professor of Psychiatry at University College Dublin
 Patrick Casey (disambiguation)
 Patrick Casey (bishop of Brentwood) (Patrick Joseph Casey, 1913–1999), English bishop
 Patrick Casey (bishop of Ross, Ireland), Irish Roman Catholic bishop
 Patrick Casey (rugby union) (Patrick Joseph Casey, born 1941), Irish rugby union player
 Patrick Casey (runner) (born 1990), American middle-distance runner
 Patrick Casey (writer) (born 1978), American writer and actor
 Patrick Casey (white supremacist) (born 1989), American nationalist
 Patrick J. Casey, American biochemist and molecular pharmacologist
 Paul Casey (born 1977), English golfer
 Peter Casey (disambiguation)
 Peter Casey (born 1957), Irish entrepreneur, television personality and politician
 Peter Casey (horse trainer) (c. 1935–2018), Irish horse trainer
 Peter Casey (screenwriter) (born 1950), American television producer and screenwriter
 Peter Casey (hurler) (born 1997), Irish hurler
 Ray Casey (1900–1986), American tennis player and coach
 Raymond Casey (geologist) (1917–2016), British geologist
 Richard Casey (disambiguation)
 Richard Casey (Queensland politician) (1846–1919), pastoralist, horse racing official
 Richard Casey, Baron Casey (1890–1976), Australian Governor-General, politician, diplomat, his son
 Richard C. Casey (1933–2007), U.S. District Judge for the Southern District of New York
 Robert Casey (disambiguation), several people, including
 Robert Casey (journalist) (1890–1962), American journalist
 Robert E. Casey (1909–1982), Pennsylvania Treasurer 1977–1981
 Robert F. Casey (1921–2006), member of the Illinois House of Representatives
 Robert Gerald Casey (born 1967), American Catholic priest
 Robert K. Casey (1931–2015), member of the Florida House of Representatives
 Robert P. Casey (1932–2000), American politician
 Robert R. Casey (1915–1986), member of the United States House of Representatives from Texas
 Ron Casey (disambiguation), several names, including
 Ron Casey (Melbourne broadcaster) (1927−2000), TV executive and Australian rules football official
 Ron Casey (Sydney broadcaster) (1929−2018), TV presenter and talk-back radio host
 Ron Casey, American drummer of Brain Drill
 Ron Casey (editor) (1951−2000), US Pulitzer Prize–winning editorial writer
 Ron Casey (Canadian politician) (born c. 1950), Alberta, Canada, politician
 Ron Casey (Missouri politician) (1952−2014), state representative
 Samuel Casey (disambiguation), several people including
 Samuel Casey (silversmith) (1723/4–1773), silversmith from Rhode Island
 Samuel Casey (Upper Canada politician) (1788–1857)
 Samuel B. Casey Jr. (1927–2006), president of Pullman Company
 Samuel K. Casey (1817–1871), American politician
 Samuel L. Casey (1821–1902), U.S. Representative from Kentucky
 Sean Casey (disambiguation)
 Sean Casey (baseball) (born 1974), baseball player
 Sean Casey (Canadian politician) (born 1963), Canadian politician
 Sean Casey (filmmaker) (born 1967), filmmaker and storm chaser
 Sean Casey (rower) (born 1978), Irish Olympic rower
 Sean Casey (rugby league), rugby league footballer
 Sean Casey (wrestler) (born 1972), American professional wrestler
 Sean Casey, former head of the U.S. State Department's Office of Religion and Global Affairs
 Shaun Casey, American model
 Silas Casey (1807–1882), United States Army officer during the American Civil War
 Solanus Casey (1870–1957), Capuchin priest
 Sophie Casey (born 1991), Australian rules footballer
 Steve Casey (1909–1987), Irish wrestler
 Thomas Casey (disambiguation), several people
 Thomas Casey (Kilmallock MP) (1765–1840), Irish politician
 Thomas Lincoln Casey Sr. (1831–1896), United States Army Corps of Engineers
 Thomas Lincoln Casey Jr. (1857–1925), American expert in coleoptera, his son
 Thomas S. Casey (1832–1891), American judge and politician
 Thomas Worrall Casey (1869–1949), British Liberal Member of Parliament
 Tom Casey (Australian politician) (1921–2003), South Australian MHA and MLC
 Tom Casey (Canadian football) (1924–2002), player for Winnipeg Blue Bombers
 Tom Casey (diplomat), American diplomat
 Tommy Casey (baseball), 19th-century American baseball pitcher
 Tommy Casey (1930–2009), Northern Irish footballer
 Willet Casey (1762–1848), Canadian farmer and political figure
 William Casey (disambiguation)
 William J. Casey, Director of CIA from 1981 to 1987
 Willie Casey (Gaelic footballer) (1932–2016), Irish Gaelic footballer
 Mickey Casey (William Cofer Casey, 1905–1968), American baseball player
 William Casey (bobsleigh) (fl. 1940s), American bobsledder
 Willie Casey (born 1981), Irish professional boxer
 William Casey (bishop) (died 1591), Anglican bishop in Ireland
 Father William Casey, who established Father Casey's GAA in 1884
 William Francis Casey (1884–1957), journalist and editor of The Times
 William H. Casey (born 1955), American professor of chemistry and of geology
 William J. Casey (Massachusetts politician) (1905–1992), American politician
 Zadok Casey (1796–1862), American politician

Fictional characters
 Ben Casey, medical drama series which ran on ABC
 Buster "Rant" Casey, a character in the 2007 Chuck Palahniuk novel Rant
 Detective Casey, a character in the Mickey Mouse universe
 John Casey (Chuck), a character in the television series Chuck
 Shane Casey, a character in the television series CSI: NY
 Jared Casey, a character on the soap opera Passions
 Kevin Casey (Scrubs), a character on the medical comedy Scrubs played by Michael J. Fox
 Michael "Iceman" Casey, fictional character in Wing Commander franchise
 Michael Casey (Sons of Anarchy), fictional character
 Sean Casey, character from 1997 motion picture Night Falls on Manhattan
 Kevin Casey, a 2007 character from the Australian television soap opera Neighbours

See also
 Casey (given name)
 O'Casey, a surname

English-language surnames
Irish families
Surnames of Irish origin
Anglicised Irish-language surnames